William Ingleby or Ingliby (–1652) was an English landowner.

Career

He was the son of Sampson Ingleby (died 1604), a steward of the Earl of Northumberland, and his wife Jane Lambert from Killinghall. They lived at Spofforth Castle in North Yorkshire. William Ingleby had a brother and five sisters.

Ingleby inherited Ripley Castle and its lands when his uncle, Sir William Ingleby, died in January 1618. He was made a baronet on 17 May 1642 by Charles I.

Ingleby was a Royalist and fought at the battle of Marston Moor. Oliver Cromwell is said to have come to Ripley Castle after the battle. William Ingleby was away or in hiding. His wife Anne Ingleby refused entrance to the Parliamentarians, but agreed to speak with Cromwell in a drawing room. In some versions of the story, William's mother Jane Ingleby was the lady who faced Cromwell.

William Ingleby died in 1652.

Marriage and children

Ingleby married Anne Bellingham. Her father, Sir James Bellingham of Helsington and Levens (died 1641), had been knighted by James VI and I in 1603. Her mother Anne or Agnes was a daughter of Henry Curwen of Workington. Their children included:
 Sir William Ingleby 
 Henry Ingleby

References

People from Spofforth, North Yorkshire
William
1652 deaths